Igor Sergeyevich Mirnov (b: September 19, 1984) is a Russian professional ice hockey player who is currently playing with Buran Voronezh of the Supreme Hockey League (VHL).

Playing career
Born in Moscow, Mirnov developed in the HC Dynamo Moscow hockey system. The young prospect rose up through Dynamo ranks with NHL star Alexander Ovechkin and became the club's leader after Ovechkin's departure for the NHL.  Mirnov was drafted by the Ottawa Senators during the 2003 NHL Entry Draft.  Since the draft he established himself as a Super League elite scorer with HC Dynamo, even becoming the club's captain for the beginning of the 2007-08 season.  That season he struggled with the club and was transferred to HC Metallurg (Magnitogorsk), where he once again found his scoring touch.

Career statistics

Regular season and playoffs

International

References

External links 

1984 births
Ak Bars Kazan players
Atlant Moscow Oblast players
Buran Voronezh players
HC Dynamo Moscow players
Metallurg Magnitogorsk players
HC MVD players
HC Sibir Novosibirsk players
HC Spartak Moscow players
Living people
Ottawa Senators draft picks
Russian ice hockey centres
Traktor Chelyabinsk players
People from Chita, Zabaykalsky Krai
Sportspeople from Zabaykalsky Krai